The 2016–17 Mascom Top 8 Cup, also known as the Mascom Top 8 Season 6, was the sixth edition of the Mascom Top 8 Cup. It was played from 28 October 2016 to 1 April 2017 by the top eight teams from the 2015-16 Botswana Premier League. It was won by Jwaneng Galaxy.

History
The 2016–17 Mascom Top 8 Cup was the only domestic tournament played in Botswana since the FA Cup was not contested. The winner qualified to represent Botswana in the 2018 CAF Confederation Cup. This honour was won by Jwaneng Galaxy.

Prize money

 Champions: P1 200 000
 Runners up: P550 000
 Semifinalists: P300 000
 Quarterfinalists: P170 000

Format
The quarterfinals and semifinals were played over two legs both home and away, with only one final in a predetermined venue. Three points were awarded for a win, one point for a draw and none for a loss. Aggregate score was used to determine the winner of a round. Where the aggregate score was equal away goals were used to pick out the victor and if those were equal the tied teams went into a penalty shootout. There was no quarterfinal draw. The teams were seeded based on their position in the table, with the first placed team facing off against the eighth placed team.

Participants

Quarter-finals

Semi-finals

Final

Awards
 Top goalscorer |  Roger Katjiteo (4 goals) | BDF XI
 Tendai Nyumasi (4 goals) | Orapa United
 Player of the tournament |  Boitumelo Mafoko | Jwaneng Galaxy
 Goalkeeper of the tournament |  Anthony Gouws | Jwaneng Galaxy
 Coach of the tournament |  Mike Sithole | Jwaneng Galaxy
 Referee of the tournament |  Keabetswe Dintwa
 Assistant referee of the tournament |  Bakwena Simankalele

References

Football competitions in Botswana
Botswana Premier League